Loud is a South Korean reality television show where they form 2 boy groups: one under JYP Entertainment and another one under P Nation. The program involved 75 contestants from different countries with artistic talents competing for a spot in one of the 2 groups.

Contestants
On May 6, the profile photos for J.Y. Park and Psy were revealed along with the premiere time, which would be on June 5 at 9 PM KST. On the same day, the first contestant, Daniel Jikal, was revealed through a teaser clip. On May 20, the other 74 contestants were revealed through teaser clips, including former 1the9 member, Lee Seung-hwan, and Mason Moon's brother, Maden Moon. On May 27, 2 contestants, Ham Mo-hyeob and Riku, left the program early due to their decision to withdraw from the program. As a result, the program would start with 73 contestants instead of the original 75.

Ranking
Color key

  Top 5 of the week
  Final members of JYP Entertainment's group
  Final members of P Nation's group TNX
  Eliminated in the final elimination round
  Eliminated in the seventh elimination round
  Eliminated in the sixth elimination round
  Eliminated in the fifth elimination round
  Eliminated in the fourth elimination round
  Eliminated in the third elimination round
  Eliminated in the second elimination round
  Left the program

Note: Voting was available on SuperStar (JYPNATION, P NATION, and The SuperStar). Only users with a Dalcom ID were eligible to vote. Voting opened immediately after each episode (starting from episode 3) and closed the day before the next episode at 11:59 PM KST. For the live rounds, the global fan poll was replaced with voting results at the end of each live round.

Rounds

Round 1: Skill and Charm Evaluations
Color key

Round 2: Team Battle Evaluations
Color key

Elimination Results
Color key

Round 3: JYP's Pick Evaluation
Color key

Elimination Results 
Color key

Round 4: Psy's Pick Evaluation
Color key

Elimination Results 
Color key

Round 5: Casting Evaluation
Color key

Casting Results

Elimination Results 
Color key

Live Rounds 
Color key

Note: The members are listed from oldest to youngest according to the official website.

Results

Special Stage: Dream Debut

Final Results
Color key

Notes

References

Loud contestants